Transaction de Novo is the third studio album by Bedhead, an American indie rock band. It met with positive reviews.

History

Production
Bedhead's final LP, Transaction de Novo was recorded from May 2, 1997 to May 9, 1997, and engineered by Steve Albini. In a departure from their usual sound, Transaction De Novo featured more up-tempo, heavily distorted songs than its predecessors.

Release

Reception

Transaction de Novo received 4.5/5 stars from Allmusic, with a positive review stating "It's hard to imagine the group perfecting this sound much further." The album received a near perfect 9.6/10 score from Pitchfork Media, with the reviewer stating that "over the course of a couple of albums and EPs, Dallas' Bedhead have delivered some of the most lush, gorgeous guitar music of this, or any other decade... One gets to wondering if these people have ever played a bum note, let alone a dud song. Bedhead will make you feel more at peace with yourself. Love them accordingly." The album received a perfect 5/5 score from Tiny Mix Tapes, with the reviewer saying the album "is definitely Bedhead's most earnest release. There is much less distortion and instrumental chaos and more emphasis on concentrated song structures with plaintive, hummable melodies. Despite...extremely minute imperfections, Transaction De Novo proves itself to be one of the most intimate and lush albums ever to grace indie ears. It acts as the album that crowns Bedhead's reign as kings and founders of slowcore."

Track listing

Personnel
Musical personnel
Bubba Kadane - guitar, vocals, producer
Matt Kadane - guitar, vocals, producer
Trini Martinez - drums
Kris Wheat - bass
Tench Coxe - guitar
Production
Steve Albini - engineer

References

External links

1998 albums
Bedhead (band) albums
albums produced by Steve Albini